Altreich or Altes Reich ("Old Empire") is a German term that may refer to:
 The medieval Kingdom of Germany, i.e. the territory of the German stem duchies excluding Saxony and Bavaria
 Altreich (pre-1938 Nazi Germany), those territories that were part of Nazi Germany before 1938
 The Holy Roman Empire, in contrast to the German Reich of 1871
 The Austrian Empire, as well as Austria-Hungary, by Austrian historians

Alt-Reich is a variation of the term alt-right and may refer to:

 Alt-Reich Nation, a racist Facebook group linked to the murder of Richard Collins III